Daylight saving time (DST), also known as summer time, is the practice of advancing clocks during part of the year, typically by one hour around spring and summer, so that daylight ends at a later time of the day. , DST is observed in most of Europe, most of North America and parts of Africa and Asia around the Northern Hemisphere summer, and in parts of South America and Oceania around the Southern Hemisphere summer. It was also formerly observed in other areas.

Observance as of 2023 

In the table above, the DST start and end times refer to the local time before each change occurs, unless otherwise specified. The shift is the amount of time added at the DST start time and subtracted at the DST end time. For example, in Canada and the United States, when DST starts, the local time changes from 2:00 to 3:00, and when DST ends, the local time changes from 2:00 to 1:00. As the time change depends on the time zone, it does not occur simultaneously in all parts of these countries. Conversely, in almost all parts of Europe that observe DST, the time change occurs simultaneously at 1:00 UTC regardless of their time zone.

Morocco, including the portion of Western Sahara that it administers, also observes an annual time change but not related to seasonal daylight. The local time is decreased by one hour on the Sunday before Ramadan at 3:00, and increased by one hour on the Sunday after Ramadan at 2:00.

Past observance

Proposals to abolish seasonal changes
Many countries and territories have abolished annual time changes after observing them for many years: Argentina, Armenia, Azerbaijan, Belarus, Brazil, Cook Islands, Falkland Islands, Fiji, Georgia, Hong Kong, Iceland, Iran, Iraq, Jamaica, Jordan, Kazakhstan, Kyrgyzstan, Macau, Mongolia, Namibia, Russia, Samoa, Sudan, Syria, Turkey, Uruguay, Vanuatu, and most of Mexico. To select the time to be used all year, some of them adopted the time previously used outside their DST period, but others adopted the time previously used during their DST period, an effect known as "permanent DST".

European Union
On 8 February 2018, the European Parliament voted to ask the European Commission to re-evaluate DST in the European Union. An online survey was performed between 4 July and 16 August 2018, in which 4.6 million EU citizens responded. The survey was especially popular in Germany, resulting in 68% of all respondends located in that country. Out of all of the participants, about 84% did not desire to adjust clocks twice annually. Based on this poll, on 12 September 2018 the European Commission decided to propose an end to seasonal clock changes (repealing Directive 2000/84/EC). In order for this proposal to be valid, the European Union legislative procedure must be followed, mainly that the Council of the European Union and the European Parliament must both approve it.

The seasonal changes were supposed to stop in 2021, but the Council of the European Union asked the European Commission for a detailed impact assessment before countries would decide on how to proceed.

United States

Since 2018, several U.S. states have passed laws to abolish seasonal changes and adopt permanent DST, but these laws cannot take effect without approval from the federal government. States may freely choose whether to observe DST or not, but if they observe it they must follow the national schedule, and changing their standard time also requires approval from the federal government.

The Sunshine Protection Act would change federal law to abolish annual time changes and permanently advance by one hour the standard time in all areas of the United States that previously observed DST, effectively adopting permanent DST, from 2023. The proposal passed the Senate with unanimous consent on March 15, 2022, but still needed approval from the House of Representatives and the president.

See also
 Time zone
 UTC offset
 Lists of time zones
 Daylight saving time in Africa
 Daylight saving time in Asia
 Summer time in Europe
 Daylight saving time in the Americas
 Daylight saving time in Oceania
 Winter time (clock lag)

Notes

References

External links

 Sources for time zone and daylight saving time data
 Legal Time 2012 (as of 1 March 2012)

 
Daylight saving time